

Gerhard Conrad (21 April 1895 – 28 May 1982) was a general in the Luftwaffe of Nazi Germany during World War II. He was a recipient of the Knight's Cross of the Iron Cross.

Awards and decorations

 Knight's Cross of the Iron Cross on 24 May 1940 as Oberst and Geschwaderkommodore of Kampfgeschwader z.b.V. 2

References

Citations

Bibliography

 

1895 births
1982 deaths
People from Salzlandkreis
People from the Province of Saxony
Luftwaffe World War II generals
German Army personnel of World War I
Recipients of the Knight's Cross of the Iron Cross
German prisoners of war in World War II held by the United States
Prussian Army personnel
Reichswehr personnel
Recipients of the clasp to the Iron Cross, 1st class
Lieutenant generals of the Luftwaffe
20th-century Freikorps personnel
Military personnel from Saxony-Anhalt